Włodzimierz Szpak (born 11 February 1950) is a Polish documentary film director, photographer and author.

Biography 
Włodzimierz Szpak was born in Milanówek by Warsaw, Poland. He graduated from University of Warsaw in 1975. After that he continued his studies at the National Film School (in Łódź, Poland). He is a member of Polish Filmmakers Association.

Work 
He was active in an area of documentary film-making. There are 28 films of that kind in his creative production. Nevertheless, he started his career with the psychological story entitled "Ona" ("She") in the narrative film "On, ona, oni" ("He, She, They"). 

He had also directed the two theater plays: 1) "Rekonstrukcja poety" ("The Reconstruction of the Poet") which refers to the antiquity thread in Zbigniew Herbert’s literary output, and 2) "Noce narodowe" ("Nights of the Nation") by Roman Brandstaetter. 

His films, e.g. "Ludzie z ziemi czerwonej" ("People of Red Land"), "Krajobraz z gęsią" ("Landscape with Goose"), "Boże, zbaw Rosję" ("God Save Russia") had been discussed and commented by domestic and foreign mass media.

He was awarded at some international film festivals. In 1986 he won a "Silver Dancer" prize at the Huesca (Spain) International Film Festival for a documentary film ‘’Ludzie z ziemi czerwonej’’ ("People of Red Land"). Then in 1989 he won a "Special Reward", at the International Włodzimierz Puchalski Film Festival in Łodz – for "Krajobraz z gęsią" ("Landscape with Goose"). He took part in the TV programme in series "Mistrzowie dokumentu" ("Document Masters") as well, which was transmitted by "Kino Polska" TV channel.

Filmography

Sources: 1) Polish Filmmakers Association, see internet site: https://www.sfp.org.pl/osoba,0,1,58347,Wlodzimierz-Szpak.html [Acc.: 20 December 2020] and 2) "Filmweb" – see internet site: https://www.filmweb.pl/person/W%C5%82odzimierz+Szpak-105916 [Acc.: 20. 12. 2020]

Awards

 1986
He was awarded at a few international film festivals. Namely, in 1986 he won a "Silver Dancer" prize at the Huesca (Spain) International Film Festival for a documentary film "Ludzie z ziemi czerwonej" ("People of Red Land").

 1989
He won a "Special Reward", at the International Włodzimierz Puchalski Film Festival in Łodz – for "Krajobraz z gęsią" ("Landscape with Goose").

References

External links
 Polish Filmmakers Association internet site:  https://www.sfp.org.pl/osoba,0,1,58347,Wlodzimierz-Szpak.html
 Filmweb internet site: http://www.filmpolski.pl/fp/index.php?osoba=111497
 "Romuald.Bartkowicz.net" internet site: https://romuald.bartkowicz.net/wlodzimierz-szpak-wizytowka
 Stołeczne Centrum Edukacji Kulturalnej (Warsaw Centre of Cultural Information) – internet site see: https://scek.pl/nauczyciele-scek/wlodzimierz-szpak
 "Film Polski – internetowa baza filmu polskiego" (Internet Base of Polish Films) – see: https://www.filmpolski.pl/fp/index.php?osoba=111497
 "Vod" service internet site – see: https://vod.pl/ – https://vod.pl/filmy-dokumentalne/boze-zbaw-rosje-online-za-darmo/ydmx43y

1950 births
Living people
Polish writers
Polish film directors
Polish photographers